Chelsi Mariam Pearl Smith (August 23, 1973 – September 8, 2018) was an American actress, singer, television host and beauty queen who was crowned Miss USA 1995 and Miss Universe 1995. Smith was the third Miss USA of African-American origin, after Carole Gist (1990) and Kenya Moore (1993), in addition to being the sixth American woman to win Miss Universe and the first since Shawn Weatherly was crowned Miss Universe 1980.

Early life
Smith was born in Redwood City, California, to 19-year-old parents Craig Smith, an African-American maintenance man, and Mary Denise Trimble, a white American secretary. Her parents divorced before she was two, and her mother, an alcoholic at the time, granted Smith's maternal grandparents Barnie and Jeanette custody of her.

When Smith was seven years old, she moved with her grandparents to Kingwood, Texas, where they would later get divorced as well, causing Smith to grow up in a divided home while she attended high school in Deer Park. Prior to her win at Miss USA, she was a sophomore majoring in education at San Jacinto College.

Pageantry

Miss Texas USA
Smith competed in her first major beauty contest in 1994, when she was a semifinalist in the Miss Texas USA pageant, as Miss South East Texas USA. The following year, she competed again as Miss Galveston County USA, and won the title, as well as the Miss Congeniality award. Smith, a multiracial American, was the first titleholder of African-American heritage in the pageant's history.

Miss USA
Smith went on to compete in the 1995 Miss USA pageant on February 10, 1995. During the final telecast, Smith obtained the highest average preliminary score and entering the semifinals in first place, becoming the fourth consecutive woman from her state to make the semifinals. She became a semifinalist, and advanced to the top six in first place. The next two rounds of competition: the Top 6 judges' questions and the Top 3 final question.

When asked how she, as an advisor, would change the First Lady's image if asked for a consultation, Smith replied: "I would tell her not to change her image, actually. I believe very strongly in who I am, and I've seen 50 ladies tonight who believe very strongly in who they are, and I really think that she wouldn't have made it as far as she has if she wouldn't have been herself, so I really truly think she should stay exactly the way she is." She became the seventh woman from her state to hold the Miss USA title and also won the Miss Congeniality award as she had at her state pageant, becoming the only Miss USA winner and Miss Texas USA in history to win this award.

After her crowning, Smith was a celebrity contestant on Wheel of Fortune and an award presenter at the People's Choice Awards.

Miss Universe
After becoming Miss USA, Smith traveled to Windhoek, Namibia, to compete in the 1995 Miss Universe pageant, broadcast live from Windhoek Country Club on May 12, 1995. She was again the highest placed contestant after the preliminary competition, which propelled her into the top ten. Once again, Smith was among the final 3 contestants and went on to win the title ahead of first runner-up Manpreet Brar of India, becoming the first Miss USA and sixth representative to capture the Miss Universe crown in 15 years. At the end of her reign, she crowned Alicia Machado of Venezuela as her successor.

Life after Miss Universe
As a model, Smith worked for Hawaiian Tropic, Jantzen, Pontiac, Venus Swimwear, and Pure Protein among others. She made appearances on Martin, Due South and the TLC documentary The History of the Bathing Suit.

With the support of Music World Entertainment/Sony, Smith co-wrote and recorded with producer Damon Elliott her first single, "Dom Da Da", part of the soundtrack for The Sweetest Thing, starring Cameron Diaz. In 2003, she acted in the independent film Playas Ball, where she co-starred with Allen Payne and Elise Neal. She also co-hosted Beyoncé Knowles' special Beyonce: Family and Friends Tour on pay-per-view and appeared on HBO in Saladin Patterson's short film One Flight Stand with Marc Blucas and Aisha Tyler. She was a judge at the 2006 Miss Teen USA pageant and a guest judge for the Miss Peru 2016 beauty pageant.

In 2011, she was presented the Influential Multiracial Public Figure award.

Smith married fitness coach Kelly Blair after her reign as Miss Universe and moved to Los Angeles. They later divorced.

Death
Smith was diagnosed with liver cancer in 2017. Growing increasingly weak throughout 2018, she traveled to her mother's home in Mifflin, Pennsylvania, and she died there at the age of 45 on September 8, 2018.

References

External links
 Official Miss Universe website - Past titleholders
 

Place of death missing
1973 births
2018 deaths
African-American actresses
20th-century African-American women singers
American female models
American film actresses
Deaths from liver cancer
Miss Universe 1995 contestants
Miss Universe winners
Miss USA 1995 delegates
Miss USA winners
People from Kingwood, Texas
People from Redwood City, California
Deaths from cancer in Pennsylvania
African-American beauty pageant winners
20th-century American people
21st-century African-American people
21st-century African-American women